The discography of Mexican synthpop group Belanova includes five studio albums, two live albums, three DVDs, and numerous singles and music videos.

Albums
All regularly released albums and their chartpositions in Mexico (MEX), U.S. Billboard Top Latin Albums (USA),

Studio albums

Live albums

Singles 
All regularly released singles and their chart positions in U.S. Billboard Hot Latin Songs (US Hot Latin Songs), U.S. Billboard Latin Pop Airplay (US Latin Pop Airplay), Spanish Official Top 20 Airplay Chart (SPA),

Promotional Singles

Other Charted Songs

Videography

DVD releases
Dulce Beat Live 2006 México
Tour Fantasia Pop Live 2008 México
Sueño Electro II Deluxe Edition 2011 México

Official Music Videos

"Tus Ojos"
Released in 2003 by Universal Music México
Filmed in Guadalajara, México and directed by Harry.
Watch the video On YouTube

"Suele Pasar"
Released in 2003 by Universal Music México
Filmed in Toluca, México and directed by Harry.
Watch the video On YouTube

"Aún Así Te Vas"
Released in 2004 by Universal Music México
Filmed in Mexico City and directed by Studio Monitor.
Watch the video On YouTube

"Me Pregunto"
Released in 2005 by Universal Music México
Filmed in Mexico City and directed by Ricardo Calderon.
Watch the video On YouTube

"Por Ti"
Released in 2005 by Universal Music México
Filmed in Mexico City and directed by Oliver Castro.
Watch the video On YouTube

"Rosa Pastel"
Released in 2006 by Universal Music México
Filmed in Mexico City and directed by Chicle.
Watch the video On YouTube

"Eres Tú"
Released in 2006 by Walt Disney Records Latino
Filmed in Mexico City.
Watch the video On YouTube

"Niño"
Released in 2006 by Universal Music México
Filmed in Guadalajara and directed by José Marquez.
Watch the video On YouTube

"Baila Mi Corazón"
Released in 2007 by Universal Music México
Filmed in Mexico City and directed by Oliver Castro.
Watch the video On YouTube

"Toma Mi Mano"
Released in 2007 by Universal Music México
Filmed in Mexico City and directed by Pipitol Ibarra.
Watch the video On YouTube

"Cada Que..."
Released in 2007 by Universal Music México
Filmed in Mexico City and directed by Ángel Flores.
Watch the video On YouTube

"One, Two, Three, Go! (1, 2, 3, Go!)"
Released in 2008 by Universal Music México
Filmed in Mexico City and directed by Jesús Rodríguez.
Watch the video On YouTube

"Paso El Tiempo"
Released in 2007 by Universal Music México
Filmed in Mexico City and directed by Ángel Flores.
Watch the video On YouTube

"Nada De Más"
Released in 2010 by Universal Music México
Filmed in Mexico City and directed by Simon Brand.
Watch the video On YouTube

"No Me Voy A Morir"
Released in 2010 by Universal Music México
Filmed in Hidalgo, Mexico and directed by Simon Brand.
Watch the video On YouTube

"Pow Pow"
Released in 2010 by Universal Music México
Filmed in Mexico City and directed by Belanova.
Watch the video On YouTube

"Mariposas"
Released in 2011 by Universal Music México
Filmed in Mexico City and directed by Daniel Robles Madrigal.
Watch the video On YouTube

"Tic-Toc (feat. Lena Katina)"
Released in 2011 by Universal Music México
Filmed in Los Angeles and directed by Daniel Robles Madrigal.
Watch the video On YouTube

"Hasta El Final"
Released in 2011 by Universal Music México
Filmed in Mexico City and directed by Daniel Robles Madrigal.
Watch the video On YouTube

"Únete Al Movimiento"
Released in 2012 by Universal Music México
Watch the video On YouTube

Notes and references

Belanova
Latin pop music discographies